Killing Joke (also known as Killing Joke 2003) is the eleventh studio album by English rock band Killing Joke, released on 28 July 2003 through Zuma Recordings. It was their first album in seven years, following Democracy in 1996, and their second self-titled album, following their debut in 1980. The album was produced by Gang of Four guitarist Andy Gill and features Nirvana drummer and Foo Fighters frontman Dave Grohl on drums, a long-time Killing Joke fan. It peaked at number 43 in the UK Albums Chart.

Background and recording 

Vocalist Jaz Coleman and Dave Grohl originally intended to title the album Axis of Evil, in reference to the political lyrical themes: "It's the beginning of the American Empire. They're taking over the world. That's what's happening, and here we are at the heart of the fucking enemy. I never thought I'd see the day." The Death & Resurrection Show, the title of the opening song on the album, was also a working title.

Bassist Paul Raven had recently met Grohl, who expressed an interest in working with the band. According to Coleman, "The original idea was to have three of our favourite drummers play on the album, Dave [Grohl] being one of them. We also wanted John [Dolmayan] from System of a Down and Danny [Carey] from Tool. But when Dave heard the songs, he said, 'I want the whole thing'". Dolmayan worked with the band during early recording sessions, but the drumming on the final album is entirely by Grohl. Grohl declined to be paid for his work. The drum recording sessions took 5 days in March 2003.

During the recording of the song "Asteroid", Dave Grohl commented on the album:

The album was produced by Gang of Four guitarist Andy Gill and recorded at his Beauchamp Building studio in London, except for the drums, which were recorded at Grand Master Studios in Los Angeles.

Bass guitar is played by original member Youth and other long-time bassist Paul Raven. Youth said "The reason we brought Raven back in to do one track was because I didn't want to tour it. He was prepared to tour it but wanted to be part of the album if he was gonna tour it". Guitarist Geordie Walker originally claimed to have played "half the bass on the record." but later said "Not much at all. I think I just added a lower bass-line to 'Loose Cannon'." Grohl did not play live with the band; the drummer on the supporting tour was Ted Parsons, formerly of Swans, Prong and Godflesh.

Critical reception 

The album received positive reviews from critics. On review aggregator website Metacritic, it holds an average review score of 79/100, based on 15 reviews, indicating "generally favourable reviews".

Joshua Klein of Billboard awarded the album an 80 out of 100, noting that "Grohl's furious playing fits perfectly with the wall of rage erected by Joke vocalist Jaz Coleman and fellow founders Geordie Walker on guitar and Youth on bass". John Robb of Playlouder wrote that the album "may well be the best rock record you'll hear all year".

A negative review came from Rolling Stone, who awarded the album 2 stars out of 5 and wrote that "all the humorless gloom and doom feels oppressive after a while". Q also gave a score of 2 out of 5, stating that the album was "patchy".

In 2005, Killing Joke was ranked number 355 in Rock Hard magazine's book The 500 Greatest Rock & Metal Albums of All Time.

Track listing

Personnel 
Killing Joke
 Jaz Coleman – vocals, synthesizer
 Kevin "Geordie" Walker – guitar, bass guitar
 Martin "Youth" Glover – bass guitar
 Paul Raven – bass guitar
 Dave Grohl – drums

Additional personnel
 Andy Gill – additional guitar feedback
 Katie Summers – voice (track 2)

Technical
 Andy Gill - recording engineer, producer
 Jerry Kandiah - recording engineer
 Nick Raskulinecz - recording engineer (L.A. drum sessions)
 Alex Alekel - assistant engineer (L.A. drum sessions)
 Clive Goddard - mixing
 Milk - cover design

Charts

References

External links 
 

Killing Joke
Killing Joke
Industrial metal albums
Industrial rock albums
Albums produced by Andy Gill
Albums produced by Youth (musician)